Kathrynn "Kat" González Sosa (born 12 July 2000) is an American-born Dominican footballer who plays as a forward for collegiate team Marshall Thundering Herd and the Dominican Republic women's national team.

Early life
González was raised in Blakeslee, Pennsylvania. Her father is Puerto Rican and her mother is Dominican.

High school and college career
González has attended the Pocono Mountain West High School in Pocono Summit, Pennsylvania; the East Carolina University in Greenville, North Carolina and the Marshall University in Huntington, West Virginia.

International career
González made her senior debut for the Dominican Republic on 7 July 2021 as a 65th-minute substition in a 0–1 friendly loss to Nicaragua.

References

External links

2000 births
Living people
Citizens of the Dominican Republic through descent
Dominican Republic women's footballers
Women's association football forwards
Dominican Republic women's international footballers
Dominican Republic people of Puerto Rican descent
People from Monroe County, Pennsylvania
Sportspeople from the New York metropolitan area
Soccer players from Pennsylvania
American women's soccer players
East Carolina Pirates women's soccer players
Marshall Thundering Herd women's soccer players
American sportspeople of Puerto Rican descent
American sportspeople of Dominican Republic descent